Mehrabpur Junction railway station is located in Mehrabpur city, Naushahro Feroze district of Sindh province, Pakistan.

Services
The following trains stop at Mehrabpur Junction station:

See also
 List of railway stations in Pakistan
 Pakistan Railways

References

External links

Railway stations in Naushahro Feroze District
Railway stations on Karachi–Peshawar Line (ML 1)